The former First Church of Christ, Scientist, built in 1916 in the Classical Revival style, is a historic Christian Science church edifice located at 132 E. 4th Street in Neillsville, Wisconsin. It was designed in the form of a Greek cross by Chicago architect L. J. Corbey for Christian Science Society, Neillsville, which had been organized in January, 1912 and which later became First Church of Christ, Scientist. Its front portico is supported by four large Tuscan columns. While small in size, the building projects a large presence. Its auditorium windows are of green opalescent art glass. On March 31, 2003, it was added to the National Register of Historic Places.

First Church of Christ. Scientist, Neillsville, is no longer listed in the Christian Science Journal.

See also
 First Church of Christ, Scientist (disambiguation)
 List of former Christian Science churches, societies and buildings

References

External links
 City of Neillsville page on 132 East 4th Street

Churches on the National Register of Historic Places in Wisconsin
Former Christian Science churches, societies and buildings in Wisconsin
Buildings and structures in Clark County, Wisconsin
1916 establishments in Wisconsin
National Register of Historic Places in Clark County, Wisconsin